Games of Love and Chance is a 2003 French drama film directed by Abdellatif Kechiche and starring Sara Forestier. It won the César Award for Best Film, Best Director, Best Writing and Most Promising Actress.

The film was shot in Seine-Saint-Denis in 6 weeks in October and November 2002.

Synopsis 
A group of teenagers from the housing projects of the Paris suburbs practice a passage from the play The Game of Love and Chance by Marivaux for their French class.  Abdelkrim, or Krimo, who initially does not act in the play, falls in love with Lydia.  In order to try to seduce her, he accepts the role of Arlequin and joins the rehearsal.  But his timidness and awkwardness keeps him from participating in the play as well as succeeding with Lydia.

Cast 
Other than Sara Forestier, many of the actors in this film were inexperienced in cinema and recruited specifically for the film.

 Osman Elkharraz as Krimo
 Sara Forestier as Lydia
 Sabrina Ouazani as Frida
 Nanou Benhamou as Nanou
 Hafet Ben-Ahmed as Fathi, Krimo's best friend
 Aurélie Ganito as Magalie, the girlfriend of Krimo (broke up near the beginning of the film)
 Carole Franck as The French Professor
 Hajar Hamlili as Zina
 Rachid Hami as Rachid / Arlequin
 Meryem Serbah as the mother of Krimo
 Hanane Mazouz as Hanane
 Sylvain Phan as Slam
 Olivier Loustau, Rosalie Symon, Patrick Kodjo Topou, Lucien Tipaldi as the police
 Reinaldo Wong as The couturier
 Nu Du, Ki Hong, Brigitte Bellony-Riskwait, Ariyapitipum Naruemol, Fatima Lahbi

Reception
Games of Love and Chance garnered a 79% approval rating on Rotten Tomatoes and a 71/100 on Metacritic.

References

External links 
 
 
 
 

2003 films
2003 drama films
2000s French-language films
Best Film César Award winners
Films whose director won the Best Director César Award
Films directed by Abdel Kechiche
French drama films
2000s French films